is a train station in Yamauchi-cho Oaza Mimasaka, Takeo, Saga Prefecture, Japan. It is operated by JR Kyushu and is on the Sasebo Line.

Lines
Only local services on the Sasebo Line stop at this station.

Station layout 
The station consists of two side platforms serving two tracks (track 1 and track 3). Track 2 is a through-track which runs between the other two and a siding branches off track 1. The station building is a timber structure which used to house a ticket window but has become unstaffed and presently serves only as a waiting room. Access to the opposite side platform is by means of a footbridge.

Adjacent stations

History
In the next phase of expansion, the track was extended further west with Haiki opening as the new western terminus on 10 July 1897. Mimasaka was opened on the same day as an intermediate station on the new track. When the Kyushu Railway was nationalized on 1 July 1907, Japanese Government Railways (JGR) took over control of the station. On 12 October 1909, track from Tosu through Mimasaka and Haiki to Nagasaki was designated the Nagasaki Main Line. As such Mimasaka now became part of the Sasebo Line. With the privatization of Japanese National Railways (JNR), the successor of JGR, on 1 April 1987, control of the station passed to JR Kyushu.

The station became unstaffed in 2016.

Passenger statistics
In fiscal 2016, the station was used by an average of 353 passengers daily (boarding passengers only), and it ranked 286th among the busiest stations of JR Kyushu.

Environs
Mimasaka Post Office
Takeo City Office Yamauchi Branch

See also
 List of railway stations in Japan

References

External links
Mimasaka Station (JR Kyushu)

Railway stations in Japan opened in 1897
Sasebo Line
Railway stations in Saga Prefecture